Lawrence J. Morrissey (born September 4, 1969) is an American politician who served as Mayor of Rockford, Illinois from 2005 until 2017.

In 2001, Morrissey ran for Mayor against Doug Scott, a Democratic member of the Illinois House of Representatives. The Rockford Observer recalled his campaign centered on road improvements, education reforms, lower taxes, and a revitalized downtown. In his second attempt in the 2005 election, Morrissey defeated Scott. In 2017, Morrissey did not run for re-election.

As of 2019, he was Vice President of Government Relations and Vice President of Sales Midwest Region for Marathon Health.

Political Positions

Police & Crime 
As Mayor, Morrissey held a tough-on-crime stance, yet felt strongly against the use of excessive police force.

References

Mayors of Rockford, Illinois
Illinois lawyers
Living people
1969 births
Illinois Independents
21st-century American politicians